The Rock Island Depot in Grandfield, Oklahoma, at 201 S. Bridge Rd., was built in 1920.  It was listed on the National Register of Historic Places in 1996.

It was a rail station of the Chicago, Rock Island and Pacific Railroad.

It is a wood-frame building on a concrete foundation, with a vernacular Tudor Revival style.

Notes

References

Chicago, Rock Island and Pacific Railroad
National Register of Historic Places in Tillman County, Oklahoma
Tudor Revival architecture in the United States